Kharagpur Raj was a prominent chieftaincy, founded in the early 16th century in Bihar situated mainly in modern-day Munger district. They were notable for being one of the few chieftaincies in Bihar to convert to Islam and many of the rulers became firm allies of the Mughal authorities. At its peak, the Kharagpur Raj encompassed parts of the modern-day districts of Munger, Bhagalpur, Jamui, Lakhisarai, Godda and Deoghar. Due to its size, the Privy Council compared it with the Kingdom of Sardinia.

Origins
The chieftaincy of Kharagpur Raj was founded by the Hindu Kinwar Rajput, Babu Dandu Rai in 1503. The original rulers of this region were the Khetauris. 3 Rajput brothers, Babu Dandu Rai, Basdeo Rai and Mahender Rai from Bhojpur arrived in the region and worked for the Khetauri chief, Raja Sasanka. These three brothers eventually amassed a large following of their clansmen and deposed the Khetauris and murdered the entire family. They continued their expansion and gradually defeated all of the 52 Khetauri chiefs. Babu Dandu Rai being the eldest of the brothers established himself as the new territorial lord. He ruled for 22 years before being succeeded by his sons, Narendra Shahi and Rup Shahi.

Dandu Rai's grandson was Raja Sangram Singh who was a contemporary of Emperor Akbar. Sangram Singh initially pledged allegiance to Akbar however from 1601 onwards he rebelled against the Mughals and attempted to declare independence with the help of his son, Toral Mal. Mughal sources attest to Sangram Singh being killed in battle and his son, Toral Mal converting to Islam and reaffirming his loyalty to the Mughals. He was renamed as Roz Afzun.

The Chieftaincy of Chai was a principality founded by a branch of the Kharagpur family in the 16th century. Its capital was in Alamnagar in Bhagalpur district.

Notable rulers

Sangram Singh
Raja Sangram Singh was contemporary of Akbar. He initially was allegiance to Akbar and supression of Afagan rebellion but later during reign of Jahangir, he rebelled against Mughal rule and killed in battle with Mughal. Then his son Todar Mal converted to Islam and later appointed as of Kharagpur.

Roz Afzun
After his conversion to Islam in 1615, Roz Afzun was considered to be a loyal "servant" and commander for the Mughal authorities. Emperor Jahangir went as far as to refer to him as his most "favourite" and "permanent" servant of the Empire. He was ordered to assist Mahabat Khan in repelling an invasion by the Afghans of Balkh and dealing with insurrections by the Bundela Rajputs and he was successful in these endeavours. He achieved a rank of 2,000 zat and 1,000 sawar which was the highest of any chieftain in Bihar at the time. He is often referred to as an example of the Mughals successfully integrating a previously refractory chieftain. He died in 1631 and was succeeded by his son, Raja Bahroz.

Raja Bahroz Singh
Raja Bahroz Singh ruled Kharagpur Raj from 1631–1676. He earned the favour of Emperor Shah Jahan by embarking on a military expedition to Kandahar to pacify the local ruler. He also participated in expeditions against other refractory chiefs including Nazar Muhammad of Balkh and Jujhar Singh Bundela. Records from the time also attest to Kharagpur being quite prosperous during his reign. In particular, he instituted various reforms that encouraged increased cultivation. He also established the Ghatwali system which delegated law and order in sensitive regions to smaller land-owners.

Raja Tahawar Singh
Tahawar Singh (also known as Kunwar Tahawurr Asad), the son of Raja Bahroz, ruled Kharagpur from 1676–1727 and was a contemporary of Emperor Aurangzeb. He played an active role in multiple Mughal expeditions against rebellious forces including the nearby Chero dynasty of Palamu in modern-day Jharkhand and the Jaintia kingdom of Sylhet. He was noted for being an effective administrator of Kharagpur.

Downfall
By the time Rahmat Ali Khan became ruler in the 1800s, Kharagpur had lost its prior position as a prominent chieftaincy in the Mughal Empire and was now a zamindari estate in financial trouble.
He fell into arrears with the government revenue and was forced to sell much of his estate to the zamindars of Banaili and Darbhanga which ended a dynasty that lasted for almost 400 years.

Architecture
By the 17th century, Munger was considered to be a well fortified town with buildings in fine condition.

Francis Buchanan-Hamilton visited Kharagpur in 1811 when Raja Qadir Ali was ruling and noted the following:

See also
Muslim Rajputs
Zamindars of Bihar

References

History of Bihar
Kingdoms of Bihar
Zamindari estates
States and territories established in 1503
States and territories disestablished in 1840
Rajputs